Hosur railway station (station code: HSRA) is a railway station serving Hosur,

Administration
It is one of the stations in the Bangalore railway division currently administered by the South Western Railway zone, one of the important zones  within the Indian Railways. It is officially also known by its code:HSRA.

History
During British regime it was a terminal station connecting Tirupattur in old narrow gauge system running via Krishnagiri, another major business centre in those old golden days. After World War II, the railway line was dismantled. Then the line was further extended to Dharmapuri via  palacode. And the line was further extended to Bangalore before 20 years ago. Now it is one of the major stop in Bengaluru-Dharmapuri BG line .

References

External links
 Hosur

Bangalore railway division
Railway stations in Krishnagiri district